Fischer McAsey (born 8 March 2001) is a former professional Australian rules footballer who played for the Adelaide Football Club in the Australian Football League (AFL). Prior to being drafted, he played for Sandringham Dragons in the NAB League and for his school Caulfield Grammar School. He quit the Crows on 9 January 2023, citing personal reasons.

Statistics
Statistics are correct to the end of 2021

|- style="background:#EAEAEA"
| scope="row" text-align:center | 2020
| 
| 35 || 10 || 0 || 2 || 35 || 29 || 64 || 21 || 12 || 0.0 || 0.2 || 3.5 || 2.9 || 6.4 || 2.1 || 1.2 || –
|- 
| scope="row" text-align:center | 2021
| 
| 3 || - || - || - || - || - || - || - || - ||- || - || - || - || -|| - ||- || –
|- style="background:#EAEAEA; font-weight:bold; width:2em"
| scope="row" text-align:center class="sortbottom" colspan=3 | Career
| 1
| 0
| 2
| 35
| 29
| 64
| 21
| 12
| 0.0
| 0.2
| 3.5
| 2.9
| 6.4
| 2.1
| 1.2
| –
|}

References

External links

2001 births
Living people
Adelaide Football Club players
Sandringham Dragons players
People educated at Caulfield Grammar School
Australian rules footballers from Victoria (Australia)